Mister World 2012 was the 7th edition of the Mister World competition. It was held at the Kent County Showground, Kent, England, on November 24, 2012. Kamal Ibrahim of Ireland crowned Francisco Escobar of Colombia at the end of the event.

Results

Placements

Order of Announcements

Challenge Events 

 Extreme is a test of strength, endurance, and determination
 Sports is a test of skill, discipline, and athleticism
 Talent & Creativity focuses on the contestants' performing arts presentation, technique, and dedication
 Fashion looks at the contestants' runway skills, style and bearing, and overall fashion sense
 Multimedia looks at contestants' interaction with the online audience mainly on different social media platforms

Fast Track Events

Sports
The Sports Challenge was held on 5 separate days with 5 different sporting events. The 5 events were fitness test on November 13, golf test on November 15, swimming test on November 17, penalty shoot-out test on November 18, and sprint test on November 22.

Talent & Creativity
The Talent Challenge was held along with the Final on November 24.

Multimedia Challenge
The Multimedia Challenge was held on November 18 at the city of Canterbury.

Extreme Challenge
The Extreme Sports Challenge was held on November 16.

Fashion & Style
The Fashion & Style Challenge was held along with the Final on November 24.

Music
 Sweat (Snoop Dogg ft David Guetta) – Denim Dance
 One Vision (Queen) – Fashion & Style Challenge
 Your Song (Elton John) – Live performance by Jonathan and Charlotte
 Call Me Maybe (Carly Rae Jepsen) – Coronation Moment

Contestants
48 contestants competed for the title

Notes

Debuts

Returns
Last competed in 1998:
 

Last competed in 2000:
 

Last competed in 2007:

Crossovers
Manhunt International
2011:  – Gianni Sennesael (2nd runner-up)
2011:  – Trương Nam Thành (3rd runner-up)
2011:  – Roland Johnson (Top 15)

Men Universe Model
2013:  – Gianni Sennesael (1st runner-up)
2013:  – Kilber Benjamin Gutiérrez Ponce

Mister International
2013:  – Gianni Sennesael 
2013:  – Tan Zeyong (Top 10)
2013:   – Rodrigo Fernandini Chu

Mister Tourism International
 2013:  – Kilber Benjamin Gutiérrez Ponce

Historical significance
 Canada, Colombia, England, Peru, Philippines, and Vietnam placed for the first time.
 Colombia won the first title.
 Ireland and Lebanon last placed in the last Mister World 2010. 
 Belgium last placed in 2003.
 Croatia last placed in 2000.
 Lebanon placed for 5th consecutive times since 2000.
 This is the first time since 2003 where there are only 10 finalists announced on the Final.

References

External links
 Official Site

Mister World
2012 in England
2012 beauty pageants
Beauty pageants in England
Events in Kent
2010s in Kent